Huizong are different temple names used for emperors of China. It may refer to:

Wang Yanjun (died 935, reigned 928–935), emperor of the Min dynasty
 Emperor Huizong of Western Xia (1060–1086, reigned 1067–1086), emperor of Western Xia
Emperor Huizong of Song (1082–1135, reigned 1100–1126), emperor of the Song dynasty
Toghon Temür (1320–1370, reigned 1333–1370), emperor of the Yuan dynasty

See also
Emperor Hui (disambiguation)

Temple name disambiguation pages